Sweet Revenge is a 1987 American motion picture starring Nancy Allen as Jillian Grey, a newscaster abducted and sold into white slavery while doing an undercover expose. Ted Shackelford, Martin Landau, Gina Gershon, Michele Little, and Lotis Key round out the cast of this R-rated action adventure directed by Mark Sobel with Roger Corman acting as executive producer.

Plot

Cast

External links

1987 films
Films about journalists
American action films
1987 action films
Films shot in Metro Manila
1980s adventure films
Films produced by Roger Corman
American action adventure films
Films shot in the Philippines
1980s English-language films
Films directed by Mark Sobel
1980s American films